Mike Schennum is a photojournalist with The Arizona Republic. His face appeared on a 2012 Time magazine cover montage for a story about Latino voters, despite the fact that Schennum has one parent who is of Chinese descent, and one parent who is of Irish and Norwegian descent.

Education
Schennum earned a B.A. in art from University of California, Santa Cruz in 2000. He also took photojournalism courses at San Francisco State University. His first Intro to Photography class sparked his interest in photojournalism.

Career
Schennum has been working in professional photojournalism for eight years. He works as a staff photographer for The Arizona Republic. Prior to working here, he was an intern at the Appleton Post-Crescent and the Palo Alto Daily News. He also taught courses in photojournalism at Arizona State University. He has done freelance work for a number of magazines and newspapers across the US.

Organizations
Schennum is a member of the Asian American Journalists Association. He was also on the board of the local Arizona chapter for seven years.

Awards and honors
In 2005 he won the Sports Illustrated Assignment award.

References

Autobiographical sketch at MVHS Alumni Directory

Year of birth missing (living people)
Living people
People from the San Francisco Bay Area
University of California, Santa Cruz alumni
San Francisco State University alumni
Artists from Phoenix, Arizona
American photojournalists
American people of Chinese descent
American people of Irish descent
American people of Norwegian descent